Tymur Vadymovych Stetskov (born 27 January 1998) is a Ukrainian professional football defender who plays for Kryvbas Kryvyi Rih in the Ukrainian Premier League.

Career
Stetskov is a product of the FC Dnipro youth sportive school system. His first trainer was Oleksiy Chystyakov.

He played at the Ukrainian amateurs level for some time, when he signed a contract with the Ukrainian Premier League club Oleksandriya.

Career statistics

References

External links
 
 

1998 births
Living people
Sportspeople from Kryvyi Rih
Ukrainian footballers
Ukraine under-21 international footballers
Association football defenders
FC Hirnyk Kryvyi Rih players
FC Kryvbas Kryvyi Rih players
FC Oleksandriya players
Ukrainian Premier League players